Duchesse de Bourgogne is a Flanders red ale-style beer produced by Brouwerij Verhaeghe in Vichte, Belgium. After a primary and secondary fermentation, this ale is matured in oak barrels for 18 months. The final product is a blend of a younger 8-month-old beer with an 18-month-old beer. The name of the beer is meant to honour Duchess Mary of Burgundy, the only daughter of Charles the Bold.  She was born in Brussels in 1457, and died in a horse riding accident. Like all Flemish red ales, Duchesse de Bourgogne has a characteristically sour, fruity flavour similar to that of lambic beers.

External links 

 - Duchesse de Bourgogne – Belgian Beer on BeerTourism.com
Belgium's Great Beers

Belgian beer brands
Brouwerij Verhaeghe @ Facebook
Brouwerij Verhaeghe – Vichte